Bela Seshe (also written as Belaseshe: In The Autumn of my Life) is an Indian Bengali-language family drama film directed by Nandita Roy and Shiboprosad Mukherjee and presented by Atanu Raychaudhuri. It is produced by Windows and distributed by Eros International. Veteran actors Soumitra Chatterjee and Swatilekha Sengupta played the lead roles in this film. This pair was last seen in Satyajit Ray’s iconic film "Ghare Baire", three decades earlier. The film also features Rituparna Sengupta, Aparajita Adhya, Monami Ghosh, Indrani Dutta, Sohini Sengupta, Kharaj Mukherjee, Shankar Chakraborty, Anindya Chatterjee, Sujoy Prasad Chatterjee, Barun Chanda and Sohag Sen in pivotal roles.

Belaseshe is the story of the separation of a couple who are on the verge of celebrating their 50th marriage anniversary. It is a tale of relationships that explores the intricacies of married life, life-long companionship, promises and expectations, and the true meaning of love.
Currently, the rights of Belaseshe are with Viacom, a multinational media company.

Plot 
75-year-old Biswanath Majumdar (Soumitra Chatterjee) is in the publishing business. His wife, Arati (Swatilekha Sengupta), is 66 years old and they have been married for 49 years. They are blessed with four children --- the eldest being their son, Barin, followed by three daughters, Malasree (Rituparna Sengupta), Kaberi (Aparajita Auddy), and Piu (Monami Ghosh), all of them now married (Malasree to Bijon, Kaberi to Jyotirmoy, Piu to Palash and Barin to Sharmistha) and well-settled. Internally, there's trouble in the siblings' married lives. Sharmistha, a medium-scale cloth merchant, is unhappy with Barin's financial position as his father's assistant in the publishing house & suspects that Barin is conducting extra-marital affairs. Malasree doesn't consider Bijon, an unemployed man but rich heir who lives on the rent of 4 flats & 2 shops in South Kolkata & an esraj-player by passion to be smart enough for her and gets involved in an extra-marital affair. Jyotirmoy, a gold trader by profession, is unhappy with the constant refusal of Kaberi, a mother of 3, to satisfy his sexual urges. Palash, being involved in the Bollywood as a director, has very little time for his assistant-cum-wife Piu. While all that is going on in their lives, on the night of Vijayadashami after Durga Puja in their North Kolkata residence, in front of the gathered family, Biswanath Majumdar drops a bombshell. He declares that he has decided to divorce his wife, and their mother, Arati. However, hard the children try, they cannot extract any information from their father, while their mother seem most unconcerned about the announcement. Biswanath files a divorce case in court. In the court proceddings, Biswanath declares that he wants to divorce Arati because he believes that their married life, having fulfilled its purpose, has been converted into a series of obligatory chores, which he wants to be freed of by starting life afresh. The judge, however, asks them to spend a 15-day vacation together, after which if they want, they can mutually divorce. The family decides to spend this 15-day vacation at their Santiniketan residence. Unsatisfied with Biswanath's explanation, Barin and his three brothers-in-law place CCTV cameras in Arati & Biswanath's room to eavesdrop on their conversation along with their spouses in order to discover the 'real reason' behind the divorce. As Biswanath and Arati share their long experiences of living together - their grudges, their disappointments, and their delights, they realize that despite having very little or no emotional connection with each other for prolonged periods due to Biswanath's busy schedule and Arati's involvement with their family, they continued to care for each other. It's drastically different from their children's actions, who have adapted the modern lifestyle and are whimsical regarding their marital lives. As they see their parents, the siblings discover their own follies and in no time, love is rekindled with their spouses. In the course of their conversations, Biswanath grudges that Arati had never loved him in person; she loved the family life and was driven by habits to care for him. Arati retorts that her family life does not exclude Biswanath and that her caring habits denote her love for him. She also grudges him for his whimsical nature towards her wishes and desires. At last, Biswanath convinces Arati to divorce him by stating that he wants to divorce Arati in order to make her self-dependent, at which Arati unwillingly agrees and the two separate. However, after four months, Biswanath finds out that Arati has managed to be self-sufficient, but he cannot get rid of his dependence on her and returns to Arati. The two reconcile emotionally and the entire family, with renewed love in their respective married lives, happily observes Biswanath and Arati's 50th marriage anniversary.

Cast 
 Soumitra Chatterjee as Biswanath Majumdar, the main protagonist of the story
 Swatilekha Sengupta as Aarti Majumdar, Biswanath's wife 
 Aparajita Auddy as Kaberi/Buri, Biswanath and Arati's oldest daughter
 Rituparna Sengupta as Malashree/Mili, Biswanath and Arati's second daughter
 Monami Ghosh as Piu, Biswanath and Arati's youngest daughter
 Indrani Dutta as Sarmistha, Biswanath, and Arati's daughter-in-law
 Sohini Sengupta in a guest appearance as neighbor
 Barun Chanda as the judge who presides over the divorce trial
 Sujoy Prasad Chatterjee as Bijon, Malasree's husband
 Arunima Halder as Buri and Jyotirmoy & Kaberi's eldest daughter
 Kharaj Mukherjee as Jyotirmay, Kaberi's husband
 Anindya Chatterjee as Palash, Piu's husband
 Shankar Chakraborty as Barin, Biswanath and Arati's only son
 Pradip Bhattacharya as Gansha- Majumdar's servant at Santiniketan
 Sohag Sen as Nalini Mukherjee, Arati's lawyer in court

Production

Inspiration and Research 
Director duo Nandita Roy and Shiboprosad Mukherjee were inspired to do this film after watching a play called Belaseshe Kolahol, written by Kajal Chakraborty and directed by Sohini Sengupta.
Chief Justice Asim Chatterjee, famously known as the ‘Puri Judge’, who used to solve marital disputes by sending estranged couples to Puri inspired the directors. Eminent advocate Jayanta Narayan Chatterjee assisted with the legal terminology in the script.

Shooting 
The film was shot both in Kolkata and Santiniketan.
The house in Santiniketan, where the film was shot, is now a major tourist attraction and is famously called the ‘Belasesher Bari’ ("The house of Belaseshe").
The shooting of Belasehse was completed in 17 days with a cast of 21 actors. The entire cast and crew stayed in Santiniketan, like a close-knit family, and completed the shooting in a week. In Kolkata, the film was shot in two different houses, both in South Kolkata. One of them was demolished right after the completion of the shooting, as the house was given up for the reconstruction of an apartment building and Belaseshe was the first and last film to be shot in that location.
The fair, shown in the film, was created within 2.5 hours and on a limited budget of Rs 7,500. The whole scene was shot candidly and the actors gave impromptu performances to make the sequence memorable. Swatilekha Sengupta's daughter, Sohini Sengupta, also the director of Belaseshe Kolahol, plays a pivotal role in the film.

Casting
Veteran actors Soumitra Chatterjee and Swatilekha Sengupta were chosen as the lead cast before the script was finalised and both of the actors signed up for the film on the same day.
Belaseshe is a rare Bengali film that has a huge ensemble cast. Stalwarts like Rituparna Sengupta, Kharaj Mukherjee, Indrani Dutta, Aparajita Auddy, and Shankar Chakrabarty acted in the film.

Release and Reception

The film was released on 1 May 2015 with 94% occupancy in theatres on the day of its release. The film was a runaway hit and had an historical run of 250 days in a single hall and 217 days in multiplexes. No other film has run continuously for 217 days in a multiplex.

'Belaseshe' became the longest-running Bengali film in 2015. Nationally, the film was released in 25 centres across the country and enjoyed a theatrical run of more than 50 days.

Book myshow rating of 4.6 out of 5.

Times of India: 4/5, Anandabazar Patrika: 8/10,

Radiomirchi: 4.5/5,

PowerFM: 4.5/5,

Oye104.

8FM: 8/10,

Ei Samay: 4/5 with a box office collection of 2.3 crores.

Off-shore release 
The film also had an off-shore release in UK, US and Singapore. 'Belaseshe' is the first film to be released in Bangladesh under the import-export laws 2012-2015 of nations included in SAFTA.

Critical reception
Shomini Sen of IBNLive reviewed "Director duo Nandita Roy, Shiboprasad Mukherjee deliver a poignant story of togetherness and the need to work hard on one's marriage in the Bengali film ‘Belaseshe’. Featuring veteran Bengali actors Soumitra Chatterjee and SwatilekhaSengupta in lead roles, the film perhaps churns out the best lessons on marriage in modern times."

Arnab Banerjee of Hindustan Times reviewed "Storytellers – be it in novels or on celluloid- have often dwelled upon the demands of the institution of marriage or the mere strict commitment and adherence to the seven vows of marriage. Rarely have films explored the intricacies of a marital relationship, that too, in a marriage where more than trust, understanding or love, it is inter-dependence that defines the conjugal bond. 'Belaseshe' is a Shiboprosad Mukherjee and Nandita Roy scripted and directed story of relationships that explores the niceties of an old couple and their married life, of their life-long companionship, of promises and expectations, and of course love."

Sankhayan Ghosh of The Indian Express reviewed "Though the two (Soumitra Chatterjee and SwatilekhaSengupta) have put in consummate performances, the film has made a mark primarily due to its unusual story."

'Belaseshe' has been one of the most critically acclaimed films of all time that has stayed alive with even the non-Bengali audience.

Mr. Amitabh Bachchan tweeted and wrote in his blog about the film. He even wrote an appreciation letter to Swatilekha Sengupta for her impactful performance in the film.

Director Mahesh Bhatt was so moved by the film that he wanted to obtain the remake rights. Malayalam actor Madhavan Nair aka Madhuji also wanted to remake the film.

Director Umesh Shukla, of '102 Not Out' fame, wanted to make the film in Gujarati. Veteran Marathi actors Ramesh Deo and Seema Deo wanted to remake the film in Marathi.

Veteran actors Rishi Kapoor and Neetu Kapoor have also praised the film.

Music 
For the first time composers Anindya Chattopadhyay and Anupam Roy collaborated in this film and the music became massively popular right from the day of its release, topping the chartbusters.

‘O Thakur jeona bishorjon’ became the most popular song of 2015. This song by Upal Sengupta and Prashmita Paul is still popular.

Marketing 
The film was associated with many big and prestigious brands as follows

 Priyo Gopal Bishoyee 
 Senco Gold
 Times Music
 Balaram Mullick
 Taj
 Nicco Park
 Damro
 SP Properties
 Samanta furniture
 Squarefour

Priyo Gopal Bishoyee also launched 'Belaseshe Saree' which became very popular. Senco Gold launched 'Belaseshe Anniversary' special collections.

Achievements 

 Won the Best Bengali film at the Zee Cine Awards 2016.
 The film received awards such as: Zee Cine Awards, Ebela Ojeyo Somman, 'NABC' awards.
 Has been included in the post-graduate diploma in the counselling course of the Legal Aid Services, West Bengal.
 It completed five years on 5 May 2020.
 'Belaseshe' was applauded by veteran actors like Amitabh Bachchan, Waheeda Rehman, Asha Parekh.
 Selected at the International Film Festival of South Asia: 2016, Toronto, Canada.
 First film to be released in Bangladesh under the import-export laws 2012-2015 of nations included in SAFTA.
 The script was published by Mitra and Ghosh and was launched by Soumitra Chatterjee, Prosenjit Chatterjee and Sandip Ray.

Spin-off
The commercial success of the film has paved the way for a spin-off titled Bela Shuru. Though complete, the release of the film was postponed due to the prevailing pandemic situation and the closure of cinema halls in the country. Soumitra Chatterjee died on 15 November 2020 due to COVID-19. Swatilekha Sengupta died on 16 June 2021 due to kidney-related ailments. Belashuru was released on 20 May 2022.

References

External links
 

Bengali-language Indian films
2010s Bengali-language films
2015 films
Films directed by Nandita Roy and Shiboprosad Mukherjee
Bengali films remade in other languages